is a Japanese footballer currently playing as a midfielder for Roasso Kumamoto.

Club career
Kojima made his professional debut on 3 July 2019 in an Emperor's Cup game against Sagan Tosu.

Career statistics

Club
.

Notes

References

External links

2001 births
Living people
Japanese footballers
Association football midfielders
Roasso Kumamoto players